Provost John Ross was Lord Provost in Aberdeen, Scotland from 1710 to 1712. Today he is most famous for the house he occupied in the 18th century from 1702.

Provost Ross's House
Built in 1593, this house is the second oldest house in the city, with Provost Skene's House being the oldest.

It is located on Shiprow and currently contains the Aberdeen Maritime Museum which has been at the site since 1984. It is owned by the National Trust for Scotland and was refurbished in the 1950s before opening again in 1954.

In 1702 Ross also purchased Arnage Castle near Ellon. Provost John Ross was involved in trading with Holland and he died in Amsterdam in 1714.

References

External links
Gazetteer for Scotland

 

Year of birth missing
Year of death missing
Ross
Ross
Provost John Ross